Hashim Salah Mohamed (born 15 April 1994) is a Qatari long-distance runner. He competed in the 3000 metres steeplechase at the 2015 World Championships in Beijing.

Competition record

Personal bests
Outdoor
1500 metres – 3:44.61 (Amsterdam 2013)
3000 metres steeplechase – 8:33.25 (Sollentuna 2015)
Indoor
3000 metres – 8:03.27 (Doha 2016)

References

1994 births
Living people
Qatari male long-distance runners
Qatari male steeplechase runners
World Athletics Championships athletes for Qatar
Place of birth missing (living people)
Athletes (track and field) at the 2018 Asian Games
Asian Games competitors for Qatar